Carnaval is a live album by bassist Ron Carter, pianist Hank Jones, saxophonist Sadao Watanabe and drummer Tony Williams which was recorded in Tokyo in 1978 and released on the Galaxy label in 1983.

Reception

The AllMusic review by Jim Todd called it "an exuberant, well-recorded set" and stated: "There is generous solo space for all, with each tune getting a solid workout on this date that definitely manages to share with the listener the excitement generated by the quartet in Tokyo's Denen Coliseum."

Track listing
 "Chelsea Bridge" (Billy Strayhorn) – 10:12
 "Manhã de Carnaval" (Luiz Bonfá, Antônio Maria) – 9:01
 "I'm Old Fashioned" (Jerome Kern, Johnny Mercer) – 8:18
 "Confirmation" (Charlie Parker) – 6:40
 "Moose the Mooche" (Parker) – 8:05

Personnel
Sadao Watanabe – alto saxophone
Hank Jones – piano 
Ron Carter – bass
Tony Williams – drums

References

Galaxy Records live albums
Ron Carter live albums
Hank Jones live albums
Tony Williams (drummer) albums
Sadao Watanabe (musician) albums
1983 live albums